Jamila Gilani (also spelled Jamila Gallani) is a Pashtun nationalist politician who is the spokesperson of the National Democratic Movement (NDM). She served as a member of the National Assembly of Pakistan from 2008 to 2013. She is an activist in the Pashtun Tahafuz Movement (PTM), a social movement campaigning for Pashtun human rights. She was formerly the central joint secretary of the Awami National Party (ANP).

Early life
Gilani was born on 5 January 1960 in  Mardan, Khyber Pukhtunkhwah, Pakistan. Her father, Mian Farid Khan, was an active member of the Khudai Khidmatgar movement and other left oriented movements. His hotel well known as Mia Srai was the hub of progressive political activists. She got politics in inheretince from childhood due to her father's active role in politics.

Political career
Gilani was elected to the National Assembly of Pakistan as a candidate of Awami National Party (ANP) on a seat reserved for women from Khyber Pakhtunkhwa in the 2008 Pakistani general election.

On 12 November 2018, she left ANP in protest when the party suspended the memberships of Bushra Gohar and Afrasiab Khattak.

References

1960 births
Awami National Party politicians
Pakistani MNAs 2008–2013
Women members of the National Assembly of Pakistan
People from Mardan District
Pakistani human rights activists
Living people
21st-century Pakistani women politicians
National Democratic Movement (Pakistan) politicians